Michigan v. Bryant, 562 U.S. 344 (2011), was a United States Supreme Court case in which the Court further developed the "primary purpose" test to determine whether statements are "testimonial" for Confrontation Clause purposes. In Bryant, the Court expanded upon the test first articulated in Davis v. Washington, "addressing for the first time circumstances in which the 'ongoing emergency' discussed in Davis extended to a potential threat to the respond police and the public at large." 

The Court stated that determination of whether an interrogation's primary purpose was to assist in an "ongoing emergency" was an objective evaluation of the circumstances "in which the encounter occur[ed] and the statements and actions of the parties."

Background 
Detroit Police Department officers were dispatched to a gas station parking lot, and found Anthony Covington severely wounded lying next to his car. Covington told the police officers that he had been shot by Richard Bryant through the back door of Bryant's house as he turned to leave. The conversation with officers lasted five to ten minutes before ambulance services arrived. Covington died hours later and Bryant was charged with murder.

At trial, the officers testified about what Covington said. Bryant was found guilty of murder. The testimony of the officers was challenged as a testimonial hearsay. Ultimately, the Michigan Supreme Court reversed Bryant's conviction, holding that the Sixth Amendment's Confrontation Clause, as explained in Crawford v. Washington (2004), rendered Covington's statements inadmissible testimonial hearsay.

Opinion of the Court and Scalia's dissent 
The United States Supreme Court reversed the Michigan Supreme Court's ruling, and held that the victim's statements were not testimonial and that they were properly admitted at trial.  The test the court used was the primary purpose test.  That test draws a distinction between statements made to the authorities that are aimed at gathering facts for the purpose of prosecution versus statements made because there is an ongoing emergency.

In Justice Antonin Scalia's dissent, he criticized the majority opinion for adopting "a test that looks to the purposes of both the police and the declarant." Scalia stated that for a statement to be "testimonial", the declarant must have intended that the statement be "a solemn declaration rather than an unconsidered or offhand remark," and therefore the investigator's intent was irrelevant.

See also 
 List of United States Supreme Court cases, volume 562

References

External links
 
 Michigan v. Bryant Resource Page Containing background materials and links to key materials on the case.
 Opinion by the Michigan Supreme Court
 Michigan v. Bryant coverage on SCOTUSblog

2011 in United States case law
United States Supreme Court cases
Confrontation Clause case law
Legal history of Michigan
United States Supreme Court cases of the Roberts Court
Detroit Police Department